The Parque das Nações, colloquially known as Expo (as the site of the 1998 Lisbon World Exposition), is a freguesia (civil parish) of Lisbon, the capital of Portugal. Located in eastern Lisbon, Parque das Nações is to the east of Olivais, northeast of Marvila, and directly south of Lisbon's border with Loures. As of 2018, an estimated 31,000 people live in the area.

History

The district was laid out in 1998 as the site of the 1998 Lisbon World Exposition. Following Expo '98, the area was transformed into a modern commercial and residential district, known as the Parque das Nações (Park of the Nations).

At the time of the census carried out in 2011, an estimated 21,000 people lived in the Parque das Nações, which was shared between the Lisbon and Loures municipalities until November 2012. Following a request by local citizens for the municipality of Lisbon to annex the one belonging to Loures, thereby integrating the entire area within the Lisbon municipality, the area is now inside Lisbon and it is the city's most northeastern parish.

The freguesia was created in 2012 from parts of the parishes Santa Maria dos Olivais (Lisbon), Sacavém and Moscavide (both part of Loures municipality).

Marina
Taking advantage of its geographical position, Parque das Nações also has a brand new marina, Marina Parque das Nações  featuring 600 berths and modern infrastructures, a river pier for cruises or historical vessels and an exclusive pontoon prepared to receive nautical and on land events, and a spot for bird watching as it is sited in the Tagus Estuary, one of the largest and most diverse estuaries of Europe.

Landmarks
Lisbon Oceanarium
Casino Lisboa
Altice Arena
Gare do Oriente
Vasco da Gama Tower
Vasco da Gama Mall
Portugal Pavilion

References

Further reading
Movement for the merger of the Nations' Park

External links

Official website
Marina Parque das Nações
Universidade Sénior Parque das Nações

 
Parishes of Lisbon
Culture in Lisbon
Parks in Lisbon
World's fair sites in Portugal
2012 establishments in Portugal